Feedforward is the provision of context of what one wants to communicate prior to that communication. In purposeful activity, feedforward creates an expectation which the actor anticipates. When expected experience occurs, this provides confirmatory feedback.

Etymology
The term was developed by I. A. Richards when he participated in the 8th Macy conference. I. A. Richards was a literary critic with a particular interest in rhetoric. Pragmatics is a subfield within linguistics which focuses on the use of context to assist meaning. In the context of the Macy Conference, Richards remarked "Feedforward, as I see it, is the reciprocal, the necessary condition of what the cybernetics and automation people call 'feedback'." Richards subsequently continued: "The point is that feedforward is a needed prescription or plan for a feedback, to which the actual feedback may or may not confirm." The term was picked up and developed by the cybernetics community. This enabled the word to then be introduced to more specific fields such as control systems, management, neural networks, cognitive studies and behavioural science.

Different applications of feedforward

Control

Feed forward is a type of element or pathway within a control system. Feedforward control uses measurement of a disturbance input to control a manipulated input. This differs from feedback, which uses measurement of any output to control a manipulated input.

Management

Feedforward has been applied to the context of management. It often involves giving a pre-feedback to a person or an organization from which you are expecting a feedback.

Neural network

A feedforward neural network is a type of artificial neural network.

Behavioral and cognitive science

Feedforward is the concept of learning from the future concerning the desired behavior which the subject is encouraged to adopt.

References

Cybernetics